Guillaume Auger (born 21 March 1976) is a French former professional road cyclist. He competed in the 2001 Tour de France and the 2004 Tour de France, finishing 136th overall in both editions. His sporting career began with CC Joigny.

Major results

1995
 2nd Chrono des Nations Espoirs
1996
 3rd Paris–Tours Espoirs
1997
 1st  Road race, European Under-23 Road Championships
 1st Chrono des Nations Espoirs
 5th Road race, UCI World Under-23 Road Championship
1998
 1st Stage 5 Volta ao Algarve
 2nd Duo Normand (with Carlos Da Cruz)
 7th Kuurne–Brussels–Kuurne
1999
 1st Stage 3 Tour Méditerranéen
 9th Overall Tour de Normandie
2000
 1st GP Stad Vilvoorde
 3rd Overall Tour de Normandie
 4th Time trial, National Road Championships
2002
 9th Overall Tour of Sweden
2003
 1st Overall Circuit des Mines
 1st Stage 2a Tour de la Somme
 4th Grand Prix de la Ville de Lillers
 9th Tour du Finistère
2005
 4th Overall Tour de la Somme

References

External links

1976 births
Living people
French male cyclists
People from Joigny
Sportspeople from Yonne
Cyclists from Bourgogne-Franche-Comté